Millgate may refer to:

Places 
Millgate, Lancashire, a location in England
Millgate, Norfolk, a location in England
Millgate Farm, Johannesburg, South Africa

Other uses 
Millgate Monthly, magazine
Gabby Millgate, Australian actress
Jane Millgate (1937-2019), British academic